The Phengodinae are a subfamily of phengodid beetles (Phengodidae). It contains mostly North American species.

Genera 
 Microphengodes Wittmer, 1976, 2 spp.
 Phengodes Illiger, 1807
 subgenus Phengodella Wittmer, 1975, 20 spp.
 subgenus Phengodes Illiger, 1807, 10 spp.
 Pseudophengodes Pic, 1930, 26 spp.
 Zarhipis LeConte, 1881, 3 spp.

References

Phengodidae